José del Pilar Córdova Hernández (born 12 October 1959) is a Mexican politician from the Institutional Revolutionary Party. From 2009 to 2012 he served as Deputy of the LXI Legislature of the Mexican Congress representing Tabasco, and previously served in the Congress of Tabasco.

References

1959 births
Living people
Politicians from Tabasco
Institutional Revolutionary Party politicians
21st-century Mexican politicians
People from Paraíso, Tabasco
Members of the Congress of Tabasco
Deputies of the LXI Legislature of Mexico
Members of the Chamber of Deputies (Mexico) for Tabasco